Tenuta Monte Rosola is a winery based in Volterra, Tuscany. Dating back to the 1480s, Monte Rosola was founded in 1999 by Gottfried E. Schmitt and Maria del Carmen Vieytes. The vineyard, occupying 125 hectares, is now under the ownership of the Swedish Thomaeus family, who have owned the estate since 2013. It was sold in 2013 to Exoro Capital, a privately owned holding company of the Swedish Thomaeus family.

The vineyard has won multiple awards, including the Decanter Magazine wine awards.

Vineyards and wines 

The wines are made by Italian oenologist Alberto Antonini, who joined the estate in 1999. Monte Rosola produces different wines, all with a barrel aging process. Prior to 2013, this was exclusively oak aged. Owning vineyards of their own, Monte Rosola sources grapes from across their 125 hectare estate.

Wine varieties 
 Mastio (non-vintage) (Composition: Sangiovese Blend) - 90 points / Decanter
 Crescendo (non-vintage)  (Composition: Sangiovese) - 94 points / Decanter
 Corpo Notte (non-vintage) (Composition: Sangiovese, Cabernet Sauvignon) - Gold - Concours Mondial de Bruxelles 2013
 Canto della Civetta (non-vintage)  (Composition: Merlot) - 92 points - Decanter
 Indomito (non-vintage) (Composition: Syrah, Caberet Sauvignon) - Silver - Concours Mondial de Bruxelles 2012
 Cassero (non-vintage)  (Composition: Vermentino) 92 points / Decanter
 Primo Passo (non-vintage) (Composition: Grechetto, Manzoni, Viognier) 93 points / Decanter
 Per Mare (non-vintage)  (Composition: Viognier)

History 
In 2016, Tenuta Monte Rosola began a significant process of rebuilding and expansion, with expanded buildings. A large sculpture by Mauro Staccioli was commissioned.

See also 

 List of vineyards and wineries

References

External links 

 monterosola.com/

Wineries of Italy
Companies based in Tuscany